Lia or LIA may refer to:

Places
 Lia, Iran, a village in Dashtabi-ye Sharqi Rural District, Dashtabi District, Buin Zahra County, Qazvin Province, Iran
 Lia, Norway, a village in Sør-Fron municipality in Innlandet county, Norway
 LIA, the IATA code for Liangping Airport
 Lija, a small village in the Central Region of Malta

Organisations
 Laser Institute of America, international society for laser applications and safety
 Lead Industries Association, a defunct industry trade group
 Libyan Investment Authority
 London Irish Amateur, an English Rugby Union team
 Long Island Association, a business lobby or coalition founded in the 1920s
 Love In Action, former name of the Christian ex-gay organization Restoration Path

Science and technology
 Language Independent Arithmetic, a series of standards on computer arithmetic
 Little Ice Age, a period of cooling between the 14th and 19th centuries 
 Lock-in amplifier, a type of amplifier

Other uses
 Lia, a feminine given name (including a list of people with the name)
 Lia (food), a rice-based dish in Orissa, India
 London International Awards, an advertising awards event

See also
 Lias (disambiguation)